The Women's Art Collection (before 2022, the New Hall Art Collection) is a permanent collection of modern and contemporary art by women artists, at Murray Edwards College, Cambridge (previously New Hall), England. 

It includes over 600 works by artists of international renown and is now considered to be one of the largest and most significant collections of contemporary art by women in the world. Paintings, prints, and sculpture are displayed throughout Murray Edwards College in Cambridge. The College has no designated gallery and the works are displayed throughout its buildings and grounds. The modernist College buildings were completed in 1965 by Chamberlain, Powell and Bon and are Grade II* listed. Many of the works are on display to visitors and a self-guided tour is available from the Porters' Lodge.

The aim of the Women’s Art Collection is "to champion artists who identify as women, to give them visibility and a voice, and promote their work within the ethos of an academic college for women dedicated to gender equality."

History
The Collection has come about as the result of many gifts and loans from artists and donors. The Collection started in 1986 with the purchase of Mary Kelly's Extase (thanks to the generous support of the Eastern Arts Association and the artist herself) following her stay as artist in residence. This spurred the hope that the College might develop a permanent collection of 20th-century art by women, to inspire the female students who would live among it. In 1992, Valerie Pearl, the President of New Hall, wrote to 100 of the leading women artists in Britain and received some 75 donations in return. The collection continues to acquire works by gifts and loans from artists and alumnae. It is the largest collection of art by women in Europe and about 95 per cent of it is displayed.

On 7 March 2018, the New Hall Art Collection received accreditation from the Arts Council England which recognised the quality of the collection and the professionalism with which it was managed.

Until April 2022, the Collection was known as the New Hall Art Collection in recognition of the College's name before 2008.

Collection

The collection includes works by:

Sandra Blow
Judy Chicago
Tracey Emin
Mary Fedden
Oona Grimes
Maggi Hambling
Lubaina Himid
Susie Hamilton
Barbara Hepworth
Nicola Hicks
Vanessa Jackson
Lucy Jones
Zelda Nolte
Cornelia Parker
Emily Patrick
Gwen Raverat
Paula Rego
Julia Sorrell
Wendy Taylor

Controversy

In 2005, Maggi Hambling's painting Gulf Women Prepare for War (1986) was covered on request of a US Navy officer as a condition of a private booking for the US military. The painting depicts a woman dressed in a hijab and armed with a rocket launcher. Hambling was reported to be appalled with its censorship. Students and tutors staged a peaceful protest during after-dinner speeches.

See also
List of 20th century women artists

References

External links
 The Women's Art Collection

New Hall, Cambridge
Art museums and galleries in Cambridgeshire
Women's museums in the United Kingdom
Art collections in the United Kingdom